The predominant religion of Nagaland is Christianity. The state's population is 1,978,502, as of 2011, out of which 87.93% are Christians. The 2011 census recorded the state's Christian population at 1,745,181, making it, with Meghalaya, Arunachal Pradesh, and Mizoram as the four Christian-majority states in India. The state has a very high church attendance rate in both urban and rural areas. Huge churches dominate the skylines of Kohima, Chümoukedima, Dimapur and Mokokchung.

It was in the early part of October 1871, Supongmeren from Molungkimong village was baptised at Sibsagar and enrolled as an American Baptist Church member. He became the bridge between the American Baptist Missionary E. W. Clark, Evangelist Godhula and the then-animist Ao Nagas.
Kosasanger Council of Molungkimong Village (Dekahaimong) dispatched 60 warriors to escort Dr. E. W. Clark to escort him. It took almost three days from Sibsagar to reach Molungkimong. Clark arrived on Wednesday, 18 December and baptized 15 new converts on Sunday, 22 December 1872 at a Village drinking well called Chungli Tzübu which was permitted by the Village Council. Another miracle for Clark after which they had a worship service and celebrated the first Lord's supper. Thus, on this day, the first Naga Church was founded with 28 Baptized members. They were Dr. Clark, Godhula and his wife, Supongmeren, 9 converts baptized on 10 November at Sibsagar, and 15 converts baptized at Molungkimong on 22 December 1872.

Nagaland was one of several regions of Northeast India that experienced Christian revival movements in the 1950s and 1960s. The "Nagaland Christian Revival Church", formed in 1962, grew out of the initial phase of this movement. It had its origin in Gariphema Village of Kohima District where, in 1962, an event known as "The Great Awakening" started .

The revival emphasised believers having a "personal encounter with Christ", the witnessing of "signs and wonders" (such as miraculous healings), and having a missionary outreach to non-believing or nominally-Christian Nagas. The result was that Nagaland became an overwhelmingly Christian state, known as "the only predominantly Baptist state in the world." Among Christians, Baptists are the predominant group, constituting more than 75% of the state's population, thus making it more Baptist (on a percentage basis) than Mississippi in the southern United States, where 55% of the population is Baptist. Catholics, Revivalists, and Pentecostals are the other Christian denomination numbers. Catholics are found in significant numbers in parts of Wokha District and Kohima District as well as in the urban areas of Kohima, Chümoukedima and Dimapur.

Hinduism and Islam practiced by the non-Naga community are minority religions in the state, at 7.7% and 1.8% of the population respectively.
 
The Naga National Council had a popular plebiscite in 1951, culminated to the 1956 Constitution whose preamble affirmed the sovereignty of God the Almighty in all the universe and the entrustment of the nation to Him who never ended to sustain the descendents of the forefathers. religious relationships with India have also a specific discipline in the article A371 of the Constitution that come into force in 1963 and reserves to the Legislative Assembly of Nagaland the right to approve by resolution any Act of the Indian Parliament in respect of "religious or social practices of the Nagas".

An ancient indigenous religion known as the Heraka is followed by a few people (4,168) belonging to the Zeliangrong tribe living in Nagaland. Rani Gaidinliu was an Indian freedom fighter who struggled for the revival of Heraka, the traditional animist religion of the Naga people.

Statistics

Trends
Percentage of Christians in Nagaland by decades

Tribes
Percentage of Christians in the Scheduled Tribes

See also
 List of Christian denominations in North East India

References

External links